Raymond Edgar Dodge (August 4, 1900 – March 28, 1985) was an American middle-distance runner. He placed sixth in the 800 m at the 1924 Olympics and won the AAU indoor title in the 1,000 yards in 1926. Outdoors he placed third at the AAU Championships in 1924 and 1927. After retiring from competitions Dodge founded and ran metalworks that produced the Oscars for the Academy Awards. In May 1935 he married Ada Ince.

References

American male middle-distance runners
1900 births
1985 deaths
Olympic track and field athletes of the United States
Athletes (track and field) at the 1924 Summer Olympics
People from Woodburn, Oregon
Track and field athletes from Oregon